Club de Fútbol Petroleros de Poza Rica is a team in Mexican football that plays in Liga TDP. At an early part of the club's history they played in Segunda división. They play at Poza Rica in Veracruz.

They are nicknamed Petroleros de Poza Rica.

History 
The club began in the 1950s in Segunda división, in which they were close to gaining promotion to Primera Division on three occasions.

In the season 1962-63, the team was close to gaining promotion in the last week of the tournament. They would have gained promotion by becoming champions against Orizaba but the ended up losing the match. This loss combined with the victory of Cruz Azul against Real Zamora caused the team to have to play in the promotional tournament against Nacional, Petroleros de Ciudad Madero, and  Veracruz. This promotional tournament was decided by the league in order to increase the number of teams in Primera Division. The tournament was played from January 16, 1964 through February 16, 1964. Poza Rica found themselves in last place with only one win against Ciudad Madero on January 21 by the score of 6-1.

In the following season, 1963–64, the promotion was obtained by Petroleros de Ciudad Madero who was the leader of the standings and thus making them champions.

The team never cam close again to making it to the Primera Division and eventually were relegated to Tercera división. In Tercera division they were champion in the 1981-82 season after defeating Celaya. As a result, they were promoted to Segunda Division in which they played from the 1982-83 season through 1985-86 since the team was sold.

The team now plays in Tercera división playing their games in Estadio Heriberto Jara Corona. Their rivals are Conejos de Tuxpan.

Promotional tournament 

In order to increase the number of team from 14 to 16 for the 1964-65 the league made a playoff. The top 2 teams would be in Primera Division. The playoff was composed of the lowest team from Primera division and the 2nd-5th teams in the standings from Segunda Division as Cruz Azul had earned automatic promotion.

Honours 
 Campeón de Campeones de la Segunda división (1): 1961
 Subcampeón de la Segunda división en 1962-63, 1963–64
 Copa de la Segunda División de México (4): 1959, 1961, 1963, 1967
 Campeón de Campeones de la Segunda Division de Mexico de Segunda división: 1961

References 

Football clubs in Veracruz